Mavadi is a village in the Kollam district of Kerala, India.

The capital of the Kulakkada Panchayat are located here. The village contains a village office and a temple. Mavadi is also known as Poovattor West, named after the main town, Poovattoor.The Postal Code of Mavadi is 691507.

References

Villages in Kollam district